Lombardy renewed its delegation to the Italian Senate on March 4, 2018. This election was a part of national Italian general election of 2018 even if, according to the Italian Constitution, every senatorial challenge in each Region is a single and independent race.

This senatorial election was paired with the 2018 Lombard regional election.

The election was won by the centre-right coalition between The People of Freedom. The centre-left arrived near the Five Star Movement of comedian Beppe Grillo. All the twelve provinces gave a plurality to the centre-right coalition.

Electoral law
The new electoral law for the Senate established in 2017 by the Rosatellum Law was a form of mixed single vote. A party presents its own closed lists and it can join other parties in alliances. Two thirds of the seats are divided between coalitions, and subsequently to party lists, using the largest remainder method with a Hare quota. The party votes are then automatically transferred to the coalition leaders running in the first-past-the-post.

Results
League 9+8=17 (6)
Forza Italia 5+6=11 (1)
Brothers of Italy 1+3=4 (spin-off)
Democratic Party 8+1=9 (2)
Five Star Movement 7 (=)
Free and equals 1 (1)
others (4)

Constituencies

|-
|- bgcolor="#E9E9E9"
!align="left" valign="top"|N°
!align="center" valign="top"|Constituency
!align="center" valign="top"|Winner
!align="center" valign="top"|Alliance
!align="center" valign="top"|Party
!align="center" valign="top"|Votes %
|-
|align="left"|1
|align="left"|Milan Central
|align="left"|Tommaso Cerno
|align="center"|Centre-left
|align="left"|Democratic Party
|align="left"|41.3%
|-
|align="left"|2
|align="left"|Milan Rogoredo
|align="left"|Maria Cristina Cantù
|align="center"|Centre-right
|align="left"|League
|align="left"|38.4%
|-
|align="left"|3
|align="left"|Milan Legnano
|align="left"|Salvatore Sciascia
|align="center"|Centre-right
|align="left"|Forza Italia
|align="left"|41.9%
|-
|align="left"|4
|align="left"|Rozzano
|align="left"|Ignazio La Russa
|align="center"|Centre-right
|align="left"|Brothers of Italy
|align="left"|44.5%
|-
|align="left"|5
|align="left"|Cologno Monzese
|align="left"|Emanuele Pellegrini
|align="center"|Centre-right
|align="left"|League
|align="left"|41.2%
|-
|align="left"|6
|align="left"|Monza
|align="left"|Stefania Craxi
|align="center"|Centre-right
|align="left"|Forza Italia
|align="left"|46.8%
|-
|align="left"|7
|align="left"|Sesto San Giovanni
|align="left"|Paolo Romani
|align="center"|Centre-right
|align="left"|Forza Italia
|align="left"|41.1%
|-
|align="left"|8
|align="left"|Lecco
|align="left"|Antonella Faggi
|align="center"|Centre-right
|align="left"|League
|align="left"|51.0%
|-
|align="left"|9
|align="left"|Cantù
|align="left"|Lucia Ronzulli
|align="center"|Centre-right
|align="left"|Forza Italia
|align="left"|56.8%
|-
|align="left"|10
|align="left"|Como
|align="left"|Erica Rivolta
|align="center"|Centre-right
|align="left"|League
|align="left"|48.5%
|-
|align="left"|11
|align="left"|Varese
|align="left"|Stefano Candiani
|align="center"|Centre-right
|align="left"|League
|align="left"|49.3%
|-
|align="left"|12
|align="left"|Bergamo
|align="left"|Maria Gallone
|align="center"| Centre-right
|align="left"|Forza Italia
|align="left"|52.4%
|-
|align="left"|13
|align="left"|Treviglio
|align="left"|Simona Pergreffi
|align="center"|Centre-right
|align="left"|League
|align="left"|55.9%
|-
|align="left"|14
|align="left"|Brescia
|align="left"|Adriano Paroli
|align="center"|Centre-right
|align="left"|Forza Italia
|align="left"|47.9%
|-
|align="left"|15
|align="left"|Lumezzane
|align="left"|Stefano Borghesi
|align="center"| Centre-right
|align="left"|League
|align="left"|56.2%
|-
|align="left"|16
|align="left"|Pavia
|align="left"|Gian Marco Centinaio
|align="center"|Centre-right
|align="left"|League
|align="left"|49.6%
|-
|align="left"|17
|align="left"|Cremona
|align="left"|Daniela Santanchè
|align="center"|Centre-right
|align="left"|Brothers of Italy
|align="left"|48.1%
|-
|align="left"|18
|align="left"|Mantova
|align="left"|Isabella Rauti
|align="center"|Centre-right
|align="left"|Brothers of Italy
|align="left"|44.4%
|}

Proportional representation

Notes

Elections in Lombardy
2018 elections in Italy